Georges Portmann (1 July 1890 – 24 February 1985) was a French physician.

1890 births
1985 deaths
Democratic Republican Alliance politicians
French otolaryngologists
Physicians from Bordeaux
People from Saint-Jean-de-Maurienne
Senators of Gironde
20th-century surgeons